Lori and George Schappell (born as Lori and Dori Schappell; September 18, 1961) are conjoined twins. George has performed as a country singer.

Careers
George has designed support equipment for people with physical disabilities, including a specialized wheelchair and a mobility aid for dogs.

As country singer Reba, George has performed widely in the United States and visited Germany and Japan and in 1997, won an L.A. Music Award for Best New Country Artist. He sang "Fear of Being Alone" over the credits of Stuck on You, a comedy film about a pair of fictitious conjoined twins.

Lori acts as George's facilitator. She works in a laundry, arranging her workload around his singing commitments. She says that, as a fan of his, she pays to attend concerts, just like all the other fans, simply making herself quiet and "invisible" while he is performing.

As conjoined twins, Lori and George have appeared in a number of television documentaries and talk shows. They have also acted in an episode of the television series Nip/Tuck, in which they played conjoined twins Rose and Raven Rosenberg.

On June 21, 2007, Lori and George took part in the grand opening of "Ripley's Believe It Or Not ! Odditorium"  in Times Square in New York City. This is the first time they were billed as Lori and George Schappell.

Personal lives
Born as Lori and Dori Schappell, they are craniopagus conjoined twins joined at the head, but having very different personalities and living—insofar as possible—individual lives. George is also unable to walk due to spina bifida. As a mark of individuality, and disliking the fact that their names rhymed, George first chose to go by the name Reba, after his favorite singer Reba McEntire. By 2007, he had come out as a trans man and preferred to be publicly known as George. Guinness World Records noted that his gender transition made him and Lori the first same-sex conjoined twins to identify as different genders.

Lori and George live in a two-bedroom apartment, each maintaining their own private space. They have several pets. She is a trophy-winning bowler. They respect each other's privacy in terms of work time, recreation and relationships. Lori has had several boyfriends and was engaged, but lost her fiancé in a motor-vehicle accident. They celebrated their 50th birthday with a trip to London.

Media
Lori and George have appeared in the following programs or articles:
Unknown year: Jerry Springer
 1993: The Maury Povich Show
 September 11, 1997: The Unexplained :"The Twin Connection", as Lori and Dori
 September 12, 1998: The Howard Stern Radio Show
 October 7, 1998: Howard Stern
 1998: A&E documentary Face to Face: The Schappell Twins
 2000: The Learning Channel documentary Separate Lives
 May 15, 2002: The Jerry Springer Show; George was billed as Reba Schappell 
 August 17, 2004: American TV show Nip/Tuck, in the episode "Rose and Raven Rosenberg"; Raven was played by George (billed as Reba) Schappell; Rose was played by Lori Schappell
 May 31, 2002: Howard Stern
 2005 TV Documentary: Medical Incredible. A documentary on Discovery Health Channel.
 2005 TV documentary: Extraordinary People: Joined at the Head; George was billed as Dori Schappell
 September 24, 2007: The Greek reality show Aksizei na to deis (Worth Seeing – Αξιζει να το δεις)
 2007: The romantic comedy film X's & O's
 2007: TV documentary Inside Extraordinary Humans: Science of Conjoined Twins

References

External links
 
 
 Story about the twins from the New York Times
 BBC – Sisters' Hope: Conjoined Twins
 New York, Best Doctors, Separation Anxiety

1961 births
American country singer-songwriters
American Latter Day Saints
Conjoined twins
Converts to Mormonism
Living people
Musicians from Reading, Pennsylvania
People with spina bifida
American twins
Transgender male musicians
People from Sinking Spring, Pennsylvania
Transgender singers
Singer-songwriters from Pennsylvania
Country musicians from Pennsylvania